Elsemarie Bjellqvist (born 4 January 1944) is a Swedish Social Democratic politician who has been a Member of the Riksdag since 2021.

References 

1944 births
Living people
21st-century Swedish women politicians
21st-century Swedish politicians
Members of the Riksdag from the Social Democrats
Women members of the Riksdag
Members of the Riksdag 2018–2022